Eccellenza Friuli-Venezia Giulia is the regional Eccellenza football division for clubs in the northern Italian region of Friuli-Venezia Giulia, Italy. It is competed amongst 16 teams, in one group. The winners of the Groups are promoted to Serie D. The club who finishes second also have the chance to gain promotion; they are entered into a national play-off which consists of two rounds.

Champions
Here are the past champions of the Friuli-Venezia Giulia Eccellenza, organised into their respective seasons.

1991–92 Manzanese  	 	 	
1992–93 Pro Gorizia			
1993–94 Sanvitese
1994–95] Palmanova 			
1995–96 Cormonese			
1996–97 Tamai
1997–98 Itala San Marco
1998–99 Pro Gorizia									  	
1999–2000 Sevegliano 			
2000–01 Tamai
2001–02 Monfalcone			
2002–03 Sacilese	
2003–04 Pro Romans
2004–05 Manzanese	
2005–06 Pordenone
2006–07 Sarone
2007–08 Pordenone
2008–09 Manzanese
2009–10 Torviscosa
2010–11 I.S.M. Gradisca
2011–12 Kras
2012–13 Unione Fincantieri Monfalcone
2013–14 Fontanafredda
2014–15 Unione Fincantieri Monfalcone
2015–16 Cordenons
2016–17 Cjarlins Muzane
2017–18 Chions
2018–19 San Luigi
2019–20 Manzanese
2020–21 Not awarded
2021–22 Torviscosa

References

External links
Some Club Histories In the League

 
Sport in Friuli-Venezia Giulia
Frui
Sports leagues established in 1991
1991 establishments in Italy
Football clubs in Italy
Association football clubs established in 1991